Moriyama (written: 森山 lit. "forest mountain", 盛山 or 守山) is a Japanese surname. Notable people with the surname include:

, Japanese photographer
, Japanese manga artist
, Japanese actor and voice actor
, Japanese politician
, Japanese volleyball player
, Japanese judoka
, Japanese footballer
, Japanese baseball player
, Japanese politician
, Japanese samurai
, Japanese politician
, Japanese actor and dancer
Raymond Moriyama (born 1929), Canadian architect
, Japanese voice actress
, Japanese baseball player
, Japanese singer
, Japanese actor and voice actor
, Japanese jazz drummer
, Japanese volleyball player
, Japanese baseball player
, Japanese sport wrestler
, Japanese footballer
, Japanese footballer
, Japanese animator

Japanese-language surnames